Richard Smoke (October 21, 1944, Huntingdon, Pennsylvania – May 1995, Sarasota, California) was an American historian and political scientist.

Life
He graduated from Harvard University magna cum laude in 1965, and from the Massachusetts Institute of Technology with a Ph.D. in political science in 1972.  His doctoral thesis was entitled Toward the control of escalation: a historical analysis and his advisor was William W. Kaufmann.  A professor of political science, he became the Research Director of the Watson Institute's Center For Foreign Policy Development at Brown University in 1985.  Smoke committed suicide in 1995.

He was the co-founder of the Center for Peace and Common Security.  An internship at Brown University's Watson Institute for International Studies has been named in his honor.

Awards
 1975 Bancroft Prize

Works
 "America's 'New Thinking'", Foreign Policy, Fall, 1988
 
 War: Controlling Escalation. Cambridge, MA: Harvard UP, 1978. 
 National Security and Nuclear Weapons. Reading, MA: Addison-Wesley, 1983.
 Beyond the Hotline: Controlling a Nuclear Crisis: A Report to the United States Arms Control and Disarmament Agency. (with William Langer Ury) Cambridge, MA: Nuclear Negotiation Project, Harvard Law School, 1984.
 Paths to Peace: Exploring the Feasibility of Sustainable Peace. (with Willis Harman) Boulder, CO: Westview Press, 1987. 
 Think About Nuclear Arms Control: Understanding the Arms Race. New York: Walker, 1988. 
 Mutual Security: A New Approach to Soviet-American Relations. (editor with Andrei Kotunov) New York: St. Martin’s Press, 1991. 
"National Security and the Nuclear Dilemma: An Introduction to the American Experience in the Cold War." McGraw Hill, 1993.

References
  https://pabook.libraries.psu.edu/literary-cultural-heritage-map-pa/bios/Smoke__Richard

1944 births
1995 deaths
People from Huntingdon, Pennsylvania
Harvard University alumni
Massachusetts Institute of Technology alumni
Brown University faculty
20th-century American historians
American male non-fiction writers
Historians from Pennsylvania
Bancroft Prize winners
20th-century American male writers